From 2001 to 2003, the Grand Slam Prize of $1 million was offered to any harness racing pacer who could win the North America Cup (Woodbine Racetrack, Toronto), Meadowlands Pace (Meadowlands Racetrack, N.J.), Little Brown Jug (Delaware County Fair, Ohio) and their Breeders Crown event (Meadowlands Racetrack, NJ).

Similarly, a $1 million Grand Slam Prize was offered in harness racing to the owners of a trotter that could win the Hambletonian (Meadowlands Racetrack, N.J.), the World Trotting Derby (DuQuoin State Fair, Ill.), the Kentucky Futurity (The Red Mile, Lexington, Kentucky) and their Breeders Crown event (Meadowlands Racetrack, NJ).

No horse was able to win either the Trotting or Pacing Grand Slam.

Harness racing in the United States
Racing series for horses